The 2022–2023 mpox outbreak in South America is a part of the outbreak of human mpox caused by the West African clade of the monkeypox virus. The outbreak reached South America on 27 May 2022 when Argentina reported their first case of mpox.  8 South American countries and territories have confirmed cases.

Background 

An ongoing outbreak of mpox was confirmed on 6 May 2022, beginning with a British resident who, after travelling to Nigeria (where the disease is endemic), presented symptoms consistent with mpox on 29 April 2022. The resident returned to the United Kingdom on 4 May, creating the country's index case of the outbreak. The origin of several of the cases of mpox in the United Kingdom is unknown. Some monitors saw community transmission taking place in the London area as of mid-May, but it has been suggested that cases were already spreading in Europe in the previous months.

Transmission 

A large portion of those infected were believed to have not recently traveled to areas of Africa where mpox is normally found, such as Nigeria, the Democratic Republic of the Congo as well as central and western Africa. It is believed to be transmitted by close contact with sick people, with extra caution for those individuals with lesions on their skin or genitals, along with their bedding and clothing. The CDC has also stated that individuals should avoid contact and consumption of dead animals such as rats, squirrels, monkeys and apes along with wild game or lotions derived from animals in Africa.

In addition to more common symptoms, such as fever, headache, swollen lymph nodes, and rashes or lesions, some patients have also experienced proctitis, an inflammation of the rectum lining. CDC has also warned clinicians to not rule out mpox in patients with sexually transmitted infections since there have been reports of co-infections with syphilis, gonorrhea, chlamydia, and herpes.

Timeline

Arrival 
An index case was imported into Argentina on 27 May. It was unknown how the disease was contracted, but likely abroad in mpox-affected countries. The patient had likely showed symptoms since 25 May, and was admitted to a hospital on 26 May. The next day, the patient was confirmed to have contracted mpox. The following day, another mpox case was confirmed, and Argentina reported these cases to Reliefweb.

Cases transited through South America

June

9 June 

On 9 June, Brazil confirmed its first case of mpox. It was in a 41-year-old male who may have been infected from recently traveling to Spain and Portugal, which had already been affected by the mpox outbreak. It was likely contracted via skin-to-skin contact.

12 June 
On 12 June, Venezuela registered its first case of mpox. It was in a male of unknown age who had likely contracted the disease via skin-to-skin contact in Madrid, Spain which had already been affected by the mpox outbreak.

17 June 

On 17 June, Chile confirmed its first mpox infection. It was in a young male of unknown specific age from the Metropolitan Region. It was likely contracted via skin-to-skin contact from a trip to Europe.

23 June 

On 23 June, Colombia confirmed its first three cases of mpox in adults of unknown genders and ages. Two of the cases were found in the capital Bogota, and the third was found in Colombia's second city, Medellin. It was unknown how those cases were contracted, although it was likely skin-to-skin contact picked up abroad.

26 June 

On 26 June, Peru reported its first case of mpox. It was in a foreign citizen of unknown gender or age who resides in Lima, Peru. The patient likely got infected via while being in contact with people from abroad. It was likely skin-to-skin contact rather than sexual contact.

July

6 July 
On 6 July, Ecuador reported its first mpox infection. It was in a 30-year-old male who resides in the Southwest coastal province of Guayas, Ecuador. It is unknown how the patient contracted the disease, but likely skin-to-skin contact picked up abroad.

29 July 
On 29 July, Uruguay registered its first case of mpox. It was in a patient of unknown age and gender. It is unknown how the disease was contracted, but likely skin-to-skin contact abroad.

August

1 August 
On 1 August, Bolivia confirmed its first case of mpox. It was in a 38-year-old male. It is unknown how the disease was contracted, but likely skin-to-skin contact picked up abroad.

Responses

World Health Organization (WHO)
On 20 May, the WHO convened an emergency meeting of independent advisers to discuss the outbreak and assess the threat level. Its European chief, Hans Kluge, expressed concern that infections could accelerate in Europe as people gather for parties and festivals over the summer. On 14 June, the WHO announced plans to rename disease from monkeypox to mpox in order to combat stigma and racism surrounding the disease. Another meeting convened on 23 June determined that the outbreak does not constitute a Public Health Emergency of International Concern for the time being.

Countries
The majority of South American countries responded to the outbreak, and the responses of some are listed below.

: The Brazilian Ministry of Health created groups of biologists to monitor monkeys and medical groups to monitor possible cases. On August 8, 2022, during a podcast, the president of Brazil Jair Bolsonaro made homophobic jokes about the disease. When questioning the host about whether he would get a mpox vaccine, and the host says yes; Jair Bolsonaro replied: "I'm sure you want to get the vaccine. You don't fool me" followed by laughter. The host remains in his serious speech on the subject, Bolsonaro commented: "Don't you understand?" clarifying the homophobic tone of the comment.

: As of May, the Colombian Ministry of Health was taking follow-up and control measures. The Director of Epidemiology and Demography of the Ministry of Health, Claudia Cuellar, informed the Colombian population about how mpox is spread through people, and she spoke about the clinical presentation of the virus and international health regulations. Health authorities in the Department of Norte de Santander have been on alert, since the department is a border area where people pass between Colombia and Venezuela.

Cases per country and territory
This is a table of confirmed and suspected mpox cases in South American countries during the ongoing 2022–2023 mpox outbreak. It does not include countries where suspected cases were reported but later discarded.

Timeline of first confirmed cases by country or territory

Timeline of suspected cases by country or territory 
Countries listed below had only suspected cases at the time of reporting. Some countries reported confirmed cases after reporting suspected cases. Countries listed several times reported suspected cases again after they discarded suspected cases before.

Timeline of first deaths by country or territory

See also 

 2022–2023 mpox outbreak
 2022–2023 mpox outbreak in Asia
 2022–2023 mpox outbreak in Europe
 2022–2023 mpox outbreak in North America

Notes

References

External links

South America
Mpox
2022 in South America 
Mpox
2023 in South America 
Health disasters in South America